Hamath-zobah was a place of uncertain location in Aram or Ancient Israel. It is not referred to in the parallel or source passage in 1 Kings 9. 

Hamath and Zobah were likely adjoining kingdoms, whence the compound name "Hamath-Zobah", an idea supported by mention of wars between Hadadezer of Zobah and Toi of Hamath in 2 Samuel 8:9-10. According to Martin J. Selman, the existence of a joint name "Hamath-Zobah" indicated that by the time of Solomon the two kingdoms had joined into a single polity.

See also
 History of ancient Israel and Judah
 Homs

References

Hebrew Bible places